Pancreaticobiliary maljunction is a congenital malformation, in which the pancreatic and bile ducts join anatomically outside the duodenal wall, forming a markedly long common channel. This anomaly prevents normal control by the sphincter of Oddi located in the duodenal wall, allowing regurgitation of pancreatic juices into the biliary tract and possibly leading to a higher probability of pancreaticobiliary cancers.

References

Anatomy